Pantophaea oneili is a moth of the family Sphingidae. It is known from Zimbabwe.

References

Endemic fauna of Zimbabwe
Sphingini
Lepidoptera of Zimbabwe
Moths of Sub-Saharan Africa
Moths described in 1925